Willie A. Williamson Jr. (November 23, 1944 – August 7, 2021) was an American football coach. He served as head football coach at Albany State University from 1980 to 1981 and at Kentucky State University in Frankfort, Kentucky, compiling a career college football coaching record of 6–16.

Williamson attended high school in Detroit, Michigan and played college football as a running back and defensive back at Anderson College—now known as Anderson University—in Anderson, Indiana. He played semi-pro football for three seasons with the Los Angeles Mustangs of the Western Professional League. Williamson was suspended indefinitely from his post at Kentucky State in late October 1984 after criticizing the team's schedule.  He was replaced by Theo Lemon as interim head coach.

Williamson died on August 7, 2021.

Head coaching record

College

Notes

References

1944 births
2021 deaths
American football defensive backs
American football running backs
Albany State Golden Rams football coaches
Anderson Ravens football players
Kentucky State Thorobreds football coaches
Virginia Union Panthers football coaches
Winston-Salem State Rams football coaches
High school football coaches in Virginia
Coaches of American football from Michigan
Players of American football from Detroit
African-American coaches of American football
African-American players of American football
20th-century African-American sportspeople